On 5 September 2022, an attempted suicide bombing occurred outside the Embassy of Russia, in Kabul, Afghanistan.

The attack was carried out at around 10:50 a.m., when a crowd of people were gathering to apply for visas to travel to Russia. Kabul police said that the terrorist had been shot dead in the attack by security forces, but his bombs exploded after he was killed. The terrorist attack killed at least eight people according to Al Jazeera but RIA Novosti reported that at least ten had died. Two of the dead were embassy employees, including an unnamed security guard and a secretary, Mikhail Shah. Police said that two employees and at least four Afghan civilians were killed.

An unclear number of people were injured in the bombing. RIA Novosti reported 15 to 20 wounded.

Russian Foreign Minister Sergey Lavrov condemned the attack and held a moment of silence for the victims. According to Reuters and Gazeta.Ru, the Islamic State – Khorasan Province (IS-KP) group claimed responsibility for the attack via Telegram.

See also
 List of terrorist attacks in Kabul

References

2022 in international relations
2022 in Kabul
2022 murders in Afghanistan
2020s building bombings
21st-century mass murder in Afghanistan
Afghanistan–Russia relations
Attacks on buildings and structures in 2022
Russia
Afghanistan
Building bombings in Kabul
Explosions in 2022
ISIL terrorist incidents in Afghanistan
Islamic terrorist incidents in 2022
Mass murder in 2022
Mass murder in Kabul
September 2022 crimes in Asia
September 2022 events in Afghanistan
Suicide bombings in 2022
Suicide bombings in Kabul
Terrorist incidents in Afghanistan in 2022